is a Buddhist temple in Nara, Japan. Founded in the eighth century, its Muromachi-period Hondō and the Heian-period statue of Amida Nyorai enshrined within are Important Cultural Properties.

Name

History
Gyōki is said to have founded the temple in 721 and to have died there in 749. The Hondō was re-erected in the early Muromachi period. For a long time temple lay in the midst of rice fields.

Buildings
The three by two bay Hondō, with tiled hipped roof and mokoshi, is unusual among wayō style buildings in being open, like the Tōdai-ji Daibutsuden, for its full height (without the need occasioned by the latter's daibutsu), in being so narrow and shallow relative to its height, and in having an open porch extending across its entire front. An early Muromachi period rebuild, it was dismantled for repair and reconstruction in 1933. It has been designated an Important Cultural Property.

Treasures
In the Hondō are a seated wooden statue of Amida Nyorai dating from the Heian period (ICP), flanked by Kannon and Seishi of the Nanboku-chō period.

See also
 For an explanation of terms concerning Japanese Buddhism, Japanese Buddhist art, and Japanese Buddhist temple architecture, see the Glossary of Japanese Buddhism.

References

External links
  Kikō-ji

8th-century Buddhist temples
Buddhist temples in Nara, Nara
8th-century establishments in Japan
Religious buildings and structures completed in 721